Neodriessenia is a genus of flowering plants belonging to the family Melastomataceae.

It is native to Borneo.

The genus name of Neodriessenia is in honour of Peter van Driessen (1753–1828), a Dutch doctor, pharmacist, chemist and botanist. He was also professor of medicine in Harderwijk and Groningen. It was first described and published in Bull. Bot. Surv. India Vol.16 on page 21 in 1977.

Known species
According to Kew:
Neodriessenia candelabra 
Neodriessenia hirta 
Neodriessenia pilosa 
Neodriessenia purpurea 
Neodriessenia scorpioidea 
Neodriessenia tectiflora

References

Melastomataceae
Melastomataceae genera
Plants described in 1977
Flora of Borneo